Lee Chang-Yong (born 27 August 1990) is a South Korean footballer who plays as defender for FC Anyang in K League 2.

Career
He signed with Gangwon FC on 7 December 2012.

References

External links 

1990 births
Living people
Association football defenders
South Korean footballers
Gangwon FC players
Ulsan Hyundai FC players
Asan Mugunghwa FC players
Seongnam FC players
K League 2 players
K League 1 players